Edward Mounier Boxer (1822-1898) was an English inventor.

Biography 
Edward M. Boxer was a colonel of the Royal Artillery.

In 1855 he was appointed Superintendent of the Royal Laboratory of the Royal Arsenal at Woolwich. 

in 1858 he was elected a Fellow of the Royal Society.

He is known primarily for two of his inventions:
 The 1865 "Boxer rocket", an early two-stage rocket, used for marine rescue line throwing
 His 1866 "Boxer primer", very popular for centerfire ammunition Ironically, the British widely adopted the berdan primer, invented by an American, while Boxer's British design was almost universally used for American cartridges.

See also
 Hiram Berdan, inventor of the competing primer
 Rocket
 Centerfire ammunition
 History of rockets

References

External links 
 
 Colonel Edward Boxer R.A.
 Development of the Life-saving Rockets

Boxer, Mounier Edward
Boxer, Mounier Edward
1822 births
1898 deaths